Likasi (formerly official names: Jadotville (French) and Jadotstad (Dutch)) is a city in Haut-Katanga Province, in the south-east of the Democratic Republic of Congo.

Demographics

Likasi has a population of around 635,000 (2015). During the 1990s the United Nations set up feeding centres and refugee centres in and around Likasi to assist with the refugees fleeing ethnic violence in Shaba, whose arrival had increased the population of the town some 41,000.

History

Shinkolobwe mine, 20 km west of Likasi (then called Jadotville), was described by a 1943 Manhattan Project intelligence report as the most important deposit of uranium yet discovered in the world. The uranium from this mine was used to build the atomic bombs used in Hiroshima and Nagasaki in 1945.
In 1961, during the United Nations intervention in the Katanga conflict, a company of Irish UN troops deployed to Jadotville was besieged and eventually surrendered to troops loyal to the Katangese Prime Minister Moïse Tshombe.

Economy

Likasi remains a centre for industry, especially mining, and is a transport hub for the surrounding region. There are mines and refineries supplied by nearby deposits of copper and cobalt.
A $17 million crushing plant was installed in nearby Kamatanda that became operational at the start of 2019.
The crushed ore is fed to the Heap Leach Unit in Panda, then the copper-containing solution is taken to the electrolysis room at the Shituru Factories in Likasi, where high-quality copper electrodes are produced.
There is also an abandoned gold mine in Likasi, which has been commercially depleted but is still dug by artisanal miners.

Transport
Likasi is served by a station on the national railway system. The trains are mostly cargo trains and not passenger trains.

Climate
Likasi has a humid subtropical climate (Köppen: Cwa).

See also
 Railway stations in DRCongo
 Siege of Jadotville

Notes

External links

 Likasi- Jadotville

 
Populated places in Haut-Katanga Province